Steven Lewis Montgomery (born December 25, 1970) is an American former professional baseball pitcher.

A 1999 single in his only at-bat left Montgomery with a rare MLB career batting average of 1.000. He was traded along with Adam Eaton and Carlton Loewer from the Phillies to the Padres for Andy Ashby on November 10, 1999.

Montgomery is now the coach of the Sioux City Explorers, an American Association baseball team from Sioux City, Iowa. He has surpassed over 400 career wins with the team.

See also
 1991 College Baseball All-America Team

References

External links

1970 births
Living people
All-American college baseball players
American expatriate baseball players in Canada
Arkansas Travelers players
Baseball players from California
Buffalo Bisons (minor league) players
Edmonton Trappers players
Lake Elsinore Storm players
Las Vegas Stars (baseball) players
Major League Baseball pitchers
Oakland Athletics players
People from Westminster, California
Pepperdine Waves baseball players
Philadelphia Phillies players
Rancho Cucamonga Quakes players
Rochester Red Wings players
San Diego Padres players
Scranton/Wilkes-Barre Red Barons players
St. Petersburg Cardinals players